Ōsugi, Osugi, Oosugi or Ohsugi (written: 大杉 lit. "big sugi") is a Japanese surname. Notable people with the surname include:

Isamu Osugi, Japanese mixed martial artist
, Japanese baseball player
, Japanese singer
, Japanese footballer
, Japanese actor
, Japanese anarchist
, Japanese professional wrestler

See also
Ōsugi Station, a railway station in Ōtoyo, Nagaoka District, Kōchi Prefecture, Japan

Japanese-language surnames